Mota Atma (2003) is the seventy-fifth release and twenty-seventh soundtrack album by German electronic music group Tangerine Dream.

The album was the soundtrack to the documentary Mota Atma and features the father and son lineup of the band, Edgar and Jerome Froese.

Track listing

References

External links

Tangerine Dream albums
2003 soundtrack albums